Khosrowabad, also rendered as Khusrauabad or Khosroabad, may refer to the following places in Iran:

Alborz Province
Khosrowabad, Alborz

Chaharmahal and Bakhtiari Province
Khosrowabad, Kuhrang, a village in Kuhrang County
Khosrowabad, Lordegan, a village in Lordegan County

Fars Province
Khosrowabad, Kazerun, a village in Kazerun County
Khosrowabad, Shiraz, a village in Shiraz County

Gilan Province
Khosrowabad, Gilan, a village in Fuman County

Hamadan Province
Khosrowabad, Hamadan, a village in Asadabad County

Isfahan Province
Khosrowabad, Fereydunshahr, a village in Fereydunshahr County
Khosrowabad, Shahin Shahr and Meymeh, a village in Shahin Shahr and Meymeh County

Kerman Province
Khosrowabad, Arzuiyeh, a village in Arzuiyeh County
Khosrowabad, Manujan, a village in Manujan County

Kermanshah Province
Khosrowabad, Kermanshah, a village in Dalahu County
Khosrowabad-e Amjadi, a village in Sonqor County
Khosrowabad-e Faleh Gori, a village in Sonqor County

Kurdistan Province
Khosrowabad, Kurdistan, a village in Bijar County
Khosrowabad Rural District, in Bijar County

Lorestan Province
Khosrowabad, Dorud
Khosrowabad, Kuhdasht
Khosrowabad (33°47′ N 48°16′ E), Selseleh

Qazvin Province
Khosrowabad, Qazvin

Razavi Khorasan Province
Khosrowabad, Davarzan, a village in Davarzan County
Khosrowabad, Nishapur, a village in Nishapur County
Khosrowabad, Tabas, a village in Tabas County

Sistan and Baluchestan Province
Khosrowabad, Sistan and Baluchestan

South Khorasan Province
Khosrowabad, Darmian, a village in Darmian County
Khosrowabad, Nehbandan, a village in Nehbandan County
Khosrowabad Bala, a village in Nehbandan County

Tehran Province
Khosrowabad, Tehran

West Azerbaijan Province
Khosrowabad, West Azerbaijan, a village in Salmas County

Yazd Province
Khosrowabad, Abarkuh, a village in Abarkuh County